Lithocarpus luteus is a tree in the beech family Fagaceae. The specific epithet luteus is from the Latin meaning "golden yellow", referring to the acorn's indumentum.

Description
The reddish brown bark is fissured to scaly and lenticellate.

Distribution and habitat
Lithocarpus luteus is endemic to Borneo.

References

luteus
Endemic flora of Borneo
Plants described in 1970
Flora of the Borneo lowland rain forests
Flora of the Borneo montane rain forests